

Pancho Gonzales (7 December 1926 – 5 March 2016) was an Argentine footballer.

Club career
Pancho Gonzales played for Boca Juniors, OGC Nice and FC Nantes. At age 24, he moved to France where he would star for OGC Nice.

Managial career
He was manager of OGC Nice and Ivory Coast. He was technical advisor of Daewoo Royals from July 1983 to July 1984.

References

External links

1926 births
2016 deaths
Argentine footballers
Association football defenders
Boca Juniors footballers
Ligue 1 players
Ligue 2 players
OGC Nice players
FC Nantes players
Argentine football managers
OGC Nice managers
Bourges 18 managers
Angers SCO managers
Ivory Coast national football team managers
Footballers from Buenos Aires